Pidlissia may refer to the following places in Ukraine:

Pilissia, in Tysmenytsia Raion, of Ivano-Frankivsk Oblast
Pidlissia, Ternopil Oblast
Polesie (Polissia), a region of Ukraine and Belarus

See also
 Pidlyssia